The Copa Petrobras Santiago was a tennis tournament held in Santiago, Chile from 2004 to 2010. The event was part of the ATP Challenger Tour and was played on outdoor clay courts.

Past finals

Singles

Doubles

External links 
 

 
Copa Petrobras Santiago
Copa Petrobras Santiago
Copa Petrobras Santiago